"Golden Days" is a 1984 single by the UK pop group Bucks Fizz. Written by Terry Britten and Sue Shifrin, it was the follow-up to their top 20 single "Talking in Your Sleep", but failed to chart as highly. A month later it was featured on the band's fourth studio album I Hear Talk. "Golden Days" was originally recorded by Cliff Richard.

Background 
Released in October 1984, this was the thirteenth single by the group but failed to achieve the success of the group's previous hits and stalled at No. 42 in the UK Singles Chart. With lead vocals by member Bobby G, the song tells of a fading movie star who is desperate to regain some of her former glory. The song was written by Terry Britten and Sue Shifrin and was produced by Britten – the only Bucks Fizz single not to be produced by Andy Hill.

The promotional video for the song featured the group as 1920s film stars, depicting them in a black and white film as well as behind the scenes in colour. The movie star in question was played by member Cheryl Baker. As well as a 7" and 12" single, "Golden Days" was also released as a limited edition 7" picture disc EP, which featured a live medley of rock tracks which the group had performed in concert. "Golden Days" was then included on the group's album I Hear Talk, released soon after the single.

The song was originally recorded by Cliff Richard as "The Golden Days are Over" a year previously on his album, Silver.

A new extended mix of the song was produced in 2008 and featured on the Bucks Fizz album, The Lost Masters 2 - The Final Cut.

Track listing
7" single
 "Golden Days" (Terry Britten / Sue Shifrin) (4.12)
 "Where Do I Go Now" (Cheryl Baker) (4.31)

12" single
 "Golden Days" (4.12)
 "One Touch Too Much" (Andy Hill / Sue Shifrin) (3.39)
 "Where Do I Go Now" (4.31)

Limited edition EP
 "Golden Days" (4.12)
 "Where Do I Go Now" (4.31)
 "Rock Medley (Live)" (featuring the songs: "Eye of the Tiger", "Hot Legs", "Since You Been Gone", "Heartbreaker", "Dead Ringer for Love", "Whatever You Want" (8.24)

Chart history

References

1983 songs
1984 singles
Bucks Fizz songs
Songs written by Terry Britten
RCA Records singles